The Anarchical Society: A Study of Order in World Politics is a 1977 book by Hedley Bull and a founding text of the English School of international relations theory. The title refers to the assumption of anarchy in the international system (posited primarily by realists) and argues for the existence of an international society.

Despite its title, the book progresses well beyond the concept of "anarchy." The field of international relations is dominated by the declinist paradigm of inevitable imperial fall and balance of power or "anarchy." This is a Eurocentric perspective based on the case of Rome. The Anarchical Society is one of a few, and one of the earliest, works to break the bonds of Eurocentrism: In “the broad sweep of human history... the form of states system has been the exception rather than the rule” (1977: p 21).

The book also outlines Bull's theory of new medievalism.

Bibliographic details
 Hedley Bull, The Anarchical Society: A Study of Order in World Politics (London: Macmillan, 1977), .
 Hedley Bull, The Anarchical Society: A Study of Order in World Politics, 2nd edn (London: Macmillan, 1995),  (with a new foreword by Stanley Hoffmann).
 Hedley Bull, The Anarchical Society: A Study of Order in World Politics, 3rd edn (New York: Columbia University Press, 2002),  (paper),  (cloth) (includes a substantial new foreword by Andrew Hurrell).

References

External links 
 Notes: The Anarchical Society

1977 non-fiction books
Books about international relations
Columbia University Press books
English School (international relations)
International relations theory
Political realism
Political science books
Works about the theory of history